Baaghi (Hindi and Urdu: 'rebel, rebellious') may refer to:

 Baaghi (1990 film), starring Salman Khan and Nagma
 Baaghi (2000 film), starring Sanjay Dutt
 Baaghi (film series),  an Indian action thriller film series
 Baaghi (2016 film), starring Tiger Shroff and Shraddha Kapoor
 Baaghi 2, 2018
 Baaghi 3, 2020 
 Baaghi (TV series), a Pakistani biopic about Qandeel Baloch

See also 
 Baghi (disambiguation)